"Pacific Ocean Blues" is a song written by Dennis Wilson and his cousin Mike Love. It was released as the ninth track on Dennis Wilson's 1977 first solo album Pacific Ocean Blue. The track, as with the rest of the album, was credited as having been produced by Wilson and his close friend Gregg Jakobson.

A backing track was reportedly recorded by late 1975 and was Wilson's only submission for The Beach Boys 1976 album 15 Big Ones, though it was turned down by the band. The completed version, although a hard rocker, features water sound effects. Wilson has been quoted as calling the song "my least favorite cut" on the album as he reportedly felt that the song sounded incomplete.

References

1977 songs
Dennis Wilson songs
Songs written by Dennis Wilson
Songs written by Mike Love
Song recordings produced by Dennis Wilson